The ice hockey competitions of the 2014 Winter Olympics were played at two venues, located 300 meters from the other, within the Olympic Park in Sochi, Russia. The Bolshoy Ice Dome, which seats 12,000, resembles a Fabergé egg. The Shayba Arena, seating 7,000, was supposed to be a moveable structure but eventually stayed in Sochi. Both venues are international sized (60 meters by 30 meters).

The men's tournament had twelve teams competing and the women's tournament had eight teams: tournament play began on 8 February 2014. The women's concluded on 20 February and the men's on 23 February.

Canada men's and Canada women's national teams went through the tournament undefeated repeating its gold medalist achievements at the 2010 Vancouver Winter Olympics.

Medal summary

Medal table

Medalists

Teemu Selänne accomplished several feats. As part of Team Finland's bronze achievement, he is the eldest ice hockey player Olympic medalist, at age 43 years and 234 days. He increased the Olympic record for total ice hockey points, to 43. He shares the record for most appearances in ice hockey at the Olympics, 2014 was his 6th Olympiad.

Nicklas Bäckström's "A-sample" Olympic drug test detected the regulated drug pseudoephedrine; he was prevented from playing in the final. His after final "B-sample" detected a value that exceeded the limit.

Men's tournament

The tournament featured 12 countries, 9 qualifying through the IIHF World Ranking, and 3 through subsequent qualifying tournaments. The format was the same as 2010; there were three groups of 4 to determine seeding, with four rounds of elimination games. Each group winner received a bye into the second round, along with the best second place team while the remaining eight teams played a qualification game. Each quarter-final winner advanced to the semis with the winners playing for the gold medal, and the losers the bronze.

Qualification

Qualification for the men's tournament at the 2014 Winter Olympics was determined by the IIHF World Ranking following the 2012 Men's World Ice Hockey Championships. The top nine teams in the World Ranking received automatic berths into the Olympics, while all other teams had an opportunity to qualify for the remaining three spots in the Olympics.

Participating nations
The twelve nations played in three pools.

Women's tournament

The women's tournament ran from 8 to 20 February. Eight nations contested the gold. A new format was introduced, with the top 4 ranked teams in group A, with the next four in group B. The bottom two group A teams played the top 2 teams in group B in the quarter finals, where the winners played either the first or second place team in group A.

Qualification

Qualification for the women's tournament at the 2014 Winter Olympics was determined by the IIHF World Ranking following the 2012 IIHF Women's World Championships. The top five teams in the World Ranking received automatic berths into the Olympics, Russia gained direct entry by being host and all other teams had an opportunity to qualify for the remaining two spots in the Olympics.

Participating nations
The eight nations played in two groups.

On 6 December 2017 six Russian ice hockey players were disqualified for doping violations; the team was disqualified. Tatiana Burina and Anna Shukina would be disqualified ten days later.

References

External links
IIHF
Official Results Book – Ice Hockey

 
Ice hockey
2014
Winter Olympics
2014
Oly